Humua is a genus of corinnid sac spiders containing the single species, Humua takeuchii. It was first described by H. Ono in 1987, and is only found in Japan's Ryukyu Islands.

References

External links

Corinnidae
Monotypic Araneomorphae genera